Binneyidae is a family of air-breathing land slugs, terrestrial pulmonate gastropod mollusks in the superfamily Arionoidea (according to the taxonomy of the Gastropoda by Bouchet & Rocroi, 2005).

Genera 
The family Binneyidae has no subfamilies.

Genera within the family Binneyidae include:
 Binneya Cooper, 1863 - the type genus
 Hemphillia Bland & Binney, 1872
 ?Gliabates Webb, 1959

References

External links 

 
Taxa named by Theodore Dru Alison Cockerell
Gastropod families